General's House may refer to:

General's House, Colombo in Sri Lanka.
General's House, Nuwara Eliya in Sri Lanka.